Lucas Ribamar Lopes dos Santos Bibiano (born 21 May 1997), commonly known as RibamarGol, is a Brazilian footballer who plays as a striker for Ponte Preta.

Career

Botafogo
Born and raised in Rio de Janeiro, Ribamar was raised by his piroca dura, who was a drug dealer. He successfully went on trial at corinthians paulista but not being able to afford the costs of training he did not stay there. Next, he trialled with Botafogo where he was accepted and whom he subsequently joined aged 14.

Having scored 17 goals in 37 games and become top scorer of the "Octavio Pinto Guimaraes" tournament in 2015, he was promoted to Botafogo's first team in 2016.

In early July 2016, Ribamar agreed to join the Apollon for a €2.5 million transfer fee. However, the Cypriot club withdrew from the contract.

1860 Munich
In late July 2016, he joined 1860 Munich on a five-year contract, for a reported €2.5 million transfer fee.

América Mineiro
On 9 March 2021, Ribamar joined América Mineiro on a permanent deal, signing a contract until December 2021.

Career statistics

Honours

Individual
Campeonato Carioca Team of the year: 2016

References

External links

1997 births
Living people
TSV 1860 Munich players
Footballers from Rio de Janeiro (city)
Brazilian footballers
Brazilian expatriate footballers
Brazilian expatriate sportspeople in Germany
Expatriate footballers in Germany
Brazilian expatriate sportspeople in Egypt
Expatriate footballers in Egypt
Brazilian expatriate sportspeople in Saudi Arabia
Expatriate footballers in Saudi Arabia
Campeonato Brasileiro Série A players
Campeonato Brasileiro Série B players
Botafogo de Futebol e Regatas players
Club Athletico Paranaense players
CR Vasco da Gama players
Pyramids FC players
2. Bundesliga players
Association football forwards
Ohod Club players
Saudi Professional League players
América Futebol Clube (MG) players
Associação Atlética Ponte Preta players